Dichetophora is a genus of flies in the family Sciomyzidae, the marsh flies or snail-killing flies.

Species
Subgenus Dichetophora Rondani, 1868
D. australis (Walker, 1853)
D. obliterata (Fabricius, 1805)
Subgenus Neosepedon Malloch, 1928
D. biroi (Kertész, 1901)
D. boyesi Steyskal, in Boyes et al, 1972
D. conjuncta Malloch, 1928
D. hendeli (Kertész, 1901)
D. punctipennis Malloch, 1928
unplaced
D. finlandica Verbeke, 1964
D. intermedia Hendel, 1912
D. japonica Sueyoshi, 2001
D. kumadori Sueyoshi, 2001
D. meleagris Hendel, 1912

References

Sciomyzidae
Sciomyzoidea genera
Taxa named by Camillo Rondani